Scott Olson is an American guitarist, bassist, music producer and recording engineer. He played guitar with Heart between 1995–1998 and 2002–2003, and in 1996 he performed with Alice In Chains on their MTV Unplugged concert. Olson was a recording consultant for Cameron Crowe's 2000 film Almost Famous.
He performed with Alice in Chains again on February 18, 2005 during a benefit concert in Seattle for the victims of the 2004 tsunami disaster, and joined the band one more time to perform the song "No Excuses" at their concert in Washington, D.C. on October 25, 2006.

Olson produced and engineered albums for artists such as Heart, Jerry Cantrell, Queensrÿche, Deftones, Limp Bizkit, Pauline Oliveros, Powerman 5000, Unearth, Buckcherry and Dredg.

Olson attended Mount Si High School in Snoqualmie, Washington.

In 2018, Olson was diagnosed with progressive dementia. In August 2018, Heart guitarist Nancy Wilson and Alice in Chains shared on their social media pages a crowdfunding set up by friends of Olson to help cover his assisted living costs and medical expenses. As of 2019, Olson lives in a senior living facility in Kirkland, Washington.

Discography

Performer

Production

Photography credits

References

External links

Year of birth missing (living people)
Living people
American rock guitarists
American male guitarists
Heart (band) members
American record producers
American audio engineers
People from Snoqualmie, Washington